Luis Fernando Retayud Zubieta (born October 22, 1962) is a former Colombian boxer, competing in the light-flyweight division. He competed for his native country at the 1992 Summer Olympics in Barcelona, Spain, where he was defeated in the first round of the Men's Light Flyweight (– 48 kg) by Mongolia's Erdenentsogt Tsogtjargal (2:8). A year earlier he captured the bronze medal in the same division at the 1991 Pan American Games.

References
Profile

1969 births
Living people
Flyweight boxers
Olympic boxers of Colombia
Boxers at the 1992 Summer Olympics
Boxers at the 1991 Pan American Games
Colombian male boxers
Pan American Games bronze medalists for Colombia
Pan American Games medalists in boxing
Medalists at the 1991 Pan American Games
20th-century Colombian people